Rana Daggubati is an Indian actor, producer, television personality, visual effects co-ordinator, and an entrepreneur known primarily for his work in Telugu-language films, in addition to Hindi and Tamil language films. He is best known for his roles Bhallaladeva in Baahubali: The Beginning (2015) and Baahubali 2: The Conclusion (2017), Radha Jogendra in Nene Raju Nene Mantri (2017) and Arjun Verma in Ghazi (2017). His other successful films include Leader (2010), Krishnam Vande Jagadgurum (2012) and Bangalore Naatkal (2016).

Beside being an actor, Rana is also a successful producer and an visual effects coordinator. His visual effects company Spirit Media P. Limited, that specialised in animation and VFX, produced special effects for over 70 films. He is one of the key individuals of the Suresh Productions. Rana has produced the children's film, Bommalata in 2004. The film won the National Film Award for Best Feature Film in Telugu. Rana has recorded the Telugu version of the song "Lights Camera Action" along with Hiphop Tamizha and Roll Rida, for the 2019 Tamil film Action. He has also appeared in the web series Social, that premiered on Viu.

Films

As actor

Other crew positions 

 All works are in Telugu unless otherwise noted.

Television

Notes

References 

Male actor filmographies
Indian filmographies